Ad Duss is a village in Oman.

A nearby town is Limah (2.7 nm).

Populated places in Oman